Kontor Records or Kontor New Media is a record label based in Hamburg, Germany. The label's artist roster includes ATB, Tiësto, Armin van Buuren and Scooter. Jens Thele is the head manager of Kontor and is also the manager of Scooter.

Edel SE & Co. KGaA is the largest shareholder of the company and distributes its releases in German-speaking Europe. Outside Germany, Austria and Switzerland, Kontor Records have arranged multiple distribution deals with third-party labels.

History
Founded in 1996, the label originated as a club night that Jens Thele organised in Hamburg's central business district. Kontor was rapidly established as a successful musical project for local DJs and producers, and this was followed by interest from international artists. Thele has explained: "We place great importance on long-term artist relationships and development, always looking to create album projects". In 2000 the 51% of the company was acquired by the German larger company Edel AG, with Thele and other subscribers retaining operative roles in the company. As of 2004, the company's office overlooks the Hamburg dockland area. Edel is still the largest shareholder of Kontor Records and currently owns 66,79% of shares.

The label launched the Kontor.TV YouTube channel in 2006 and music videos, playlists and preview-mixes of new releases are uploaded onto the channel. As of February 2017, 4.5 million users are subscribed to Kontor.TV. In early 2013, the label entered into a partnership with the Spotify online music streaming service and Kontor.FM was launched in March 2013.

In June 2013, Kontor garnered attention for a novel promotional campaign for the new song from artist Boris Dlugosch. The recipient of the music unfolds a device entitled "The Office Turntable" that serves as a 2D Technics turntable on which Dlugosch's vinyl single can be heard. The vinyl is neon orange-colored and most types of smartphones are used to scan an activating QR code on the fold-out device. Label staff explained to the Contagious Magazine's YouTube channel that they were motivated by creative directors who often ignore the music promotions they are sent.

Compilation brands
Kontor's compilation brands include "Kontor Top Of The Clubs" and "Kontor House of House".

Affiliate and partner labels
The Sheffield Tunes imprint is a Kontor affiliate label that released the music of Scooter. Scooter's members, H. P. Baxxter and Rick J. Jordan, are company directors of Kontor Records. As of October 2013, Kontor Records is one of the numerous partners listed on the CR2 Records website, a London, United Kingdom (UK) electronic music label founded by musician Mark Brown (also known by the moniker "MYNC").

In June 2020, Kontor acquired the German rock label Arising Empire.

Artists

DJ Antoine
ATB
Armin van Buuren
Aquagen
Cascada
Code Red
Blank & Jones
 David Carson
DJ Dean
Dimitri Vegas & Like Mike
The Disco Boys
EDX
Fedde Le Grand
Hardwell
Mike Candys
ItaloBrothers
Klingande
Klubbingman
Alexander Marcus
Nightcrawlers
R.I.O.
DJ Sammy
Scooter
Giulia Siegel
Special D.
Spiller
Sunset Strippers
Alexandra Stan
Lexy & K-Paul
Martin Tungevaag
Vinylshakerz
Jan Wayne
Rania Zeriri
Tiësto
W&W

References

External links 
 
 

German record labels
Companies based in Hamburg
IFPI members
Electronic dance music record labels